Varicosia is a genus of moths of the family Erebidae. The genus was erected by George Hampson in 1924.

Species
Varicosia clavifera A. E. Prout, 1928
Varicosia venata Hampson, 1924

References

Calpinae